Shore Line Railway or Shore Line Railroad may refer to:

 Shore Line East, a commuter rail service in Connecticut
 Shore Line Railway (Connecticut)
 Shore Line Railway (New Brunswick), Canada; see Prince of Wales, New Brunswick 
 Shore Line Electric Railway, a former trolley line in Connecticut

 Shore Line Subdivision, a railroad line owned and operated by Grand Trunk Western Railroad
 Detroit and Toledo Shore Line Railroad

See also 
 Shoreline (disambiguation)
 North Shore Line (disambiguation), several railroads
 South Shore Line (disambiguation), several railroads
 
 
 Short-line railway, a railroad class
 Shortline railroad, railroads that operate over a relatively short distance